The Best of Carly Simon is singer-songwriter Carly Simon's first greatest hits album, released by Elektra Records, on November 24, 1975. Covering the first five years of her career, the compilation includes eight top 20 hit singles from her first five albums, as well as two album cuts from No Secrets (1972): "Night Owl" and "We Have No Secrets", the latter of which was released as the B-side to the single "The Right Thing to Do" in 1973.

For many years, this was Simon's only greatest hits collection, and as a result, it became her best selling album. In the late 1990s, sales in the United States alone stood at over three million copies. However, in later years the collection could not be considered a complete or definitive representation of Simon's best or most popular work because it did not include her major hits from the mid-1970s onward, such as "Nobody Does It Better", "You Belong to Me", "Jesse", "Coming Around Again", "Let the River Run", and "Better Not Tell Her". The fact that Simon had changed record labels several times (moving from Elektra to Warner Bros. to Epic to Arista) made a more wide-ranging collection a difficult proposition. A live album, Greatest Hits Live (1988), went some way to rectifying this issue, but the original recorded versions were eventually collected on the three-disc box set Clouds in My Coffee (1995), the two-disc set Anthology (2002), and the single-disc collections The Very Best of Carly Simon: Nobody Does It Better (1998) and Reflections: Carly Simon's Greatest Hits (2004). Reflections went on to become a great critical and commercial success, and was certified Gold by both the Recording Industry Association of America on March 2, 2007, and the British Phonographic Industry on July 22, 2013.

Reception

In a retrospective review for AllMusic, Jim Newsom rated the album 4-stars-out-of-5, and wrote "Opening with the powerful "That's the Way I've Always Heard It Should Be", and including four tunes from the classic No Secrets album, Simon's insightful lyrics and evocative voice remain fresh years later. This album is a good starting point for those interested in discovering why."

A contemporary review from Robert Christgau stated "Given her self-knowledge and her fans' taste, a compilation isn't going to get her at her best, though this does collect some of her more attractive melodies."

Track listing
Credits adapted from the album's liner notes.

Notes
 signifies a writer by additional lyrics

Personnel
Credits adapted from the album's liner notes

Musicians

Credits

Charts
Album – Billboard (North America)

Album – International

Certifications

References

External links
 Carly Simon's Official Website

1975 greatest hits albums
Carly Simon compilation albums
Elektra Records compilation albums
Albums produced by Richard Perry
Albums produced by Paul Samwell-Smith
Albums arranged by Paul Buckmaster